Ray Cory (March 30, 1894 – March 15, 1968) was an American cinematographer. He was nominated for an Academy Award for Best Special Effects at the 17th Academy Awards for work on the film Secret Command.

Selected filmography
 Assignment – Paris! (1952)
 Last of the Comanches (1953)
 Flame of Calcutta (1953)

References

External links

1894 births
1968 deaths
American cinematographers
People from Yakima, Washington